Juan de Zapata y Sandoval, O.S.A. (1545 – 9 January 1630) was a Roman Catholic prelate who served as Bishop of Santiago de Guatemala (1621–1630) and Bishop of Chiapas (1613–1621).

Biography
Juan de Zapata y Sandoval was born in 1545 in México and ordained a priest in the Order of Saint Augustine. On 13 November 1613, he was appointed during the papacy of Pope Paul V as Bishop of Chiapas. On 23 November 1613, he was consecrated bishop by Alfonso de la Mota y Escobar, Bishop of Tlaxcala. On 13 September 1621, he was appointed during the papacy of Pope Gregory XV as Bishop of Santiago de Guatemala. He served as Bishop of Santiago de Guatemala until his death on 9 January 1630.

References

External links and additional sources
 (for Chronology of Bishops) 
 (for Chronology of Bishops)  
 (for Chronology of Bishops) 
 (for Chronology of Bishops) 

17th-century Roman Catholic bishops in Guatemala
Bishops appointed by Pope Paul V
Bishops appointed by Pope Gregory XV
1545 births
1630 deaths
Augustinian bishops
17th-century Roman Catholic bishops in Mexico
Roman Catholic bishops of Guatemala (pre-1743)